Cathal McConnell (born 1944) is a musician and singer best known as the mainstay of traditional band The Boys of the Lough, of which he was a founder member. His main instruments are the Irish flute and the tin whistle.

Early life

McConnell came from a musical family in Tonyloman near Bellanaleck, County Fermanagh and plays his music in the traditional Fermanagh style.  His father Sandy was a well known traditional singer and musician in his own right and recorded for the BBC in the 1950s and his younger brother is the musician and songwriter Mickey MacConnell.

McConnell's early musical collaborators in Ireland were fiddler Tommy Gunn and Robin Morton.  In 1962 McConnell became All-Ireland champion in both flute and whistle.

The Boys of the Lough
After meeting at a folk festival in Falkirk, Scotland, the group The Boys of the Lough was formed and their first recording was released in 1973. Originally consisting of McConnell on flute, Aly Bain (fiddle), Dick Gaughan (vocals and guitar) and Robin Morton (bodhran and vocals). Although there have now been multiple line-up changes, the group remains active and has 21 studio albums to its name.  McConnell is the only remaining founder member.

Other projects

Outside the Boys of the Lough, Cathal has released two collections of songs and tunes, performed in duos with Robin Morton, Scots fiddler Duncan Wood, singer Len Graham, Irish fiddler Gerry O'Connor, and as 'The Cathal McConnell Trio' with Kathryn Nicoll (fiddle) and Karen Marshalsay (harp).

In recent years fiddle player Gerry O'Connor has compiled a collection from Cathal's song repertoire which has been published as I Have Travelled This Country.

Accolades

McConnell is an All-Ireland champion in both flute and whistle, winning both Senior titles at the Fleadh Cheoil na hÉireann held in Gorey, County Wexford in 1962.

Following a longstanding involvement with the annual Willie Clancy Summer School in Miltown Malbay, County Clare, the School paid tribute to McConnell with an evening of speeches, music and song dedicated to him at the 2009 event.

In 2010 McConnell was awarded the Gradam an Amhrání/Traditional Singer of the Year award at the TG4 Gradam Ceoil awards ceremony. The Gradam Ceoil award was acknowledged in Cathal's adopted hometown of Edinburgh by The Consulate General of Ireland who hosted a reception to mark the occasion.

In 2013 as part of his appearance at Cruinniú na bhFliúit Flute Festival McConnell was interviewed about his life and music.

Discography

See also The Boys of the Lough discography.

 An Irish Jubilee with Robin Morton – Topic Records (1976)
 On Lough Erne's Shore – Topic Records (1978)
 For the Sake of Old Decency with Len Graham – Sage Arts Records (1993)
 Long Expectant Comes at Last – Compass Records (2000)
 Auld Springs Gies Nae Price with Duncan Wood – Carnyx Productions (2010)
 Old Recordings of Slow Airs (2021)

Other recordings include:

 a series of whistle recordings included with the tutor book Irish Pennywhistle Taught By Cathal McConnell published by Homespun Tapes.
 an extensive series of recordings documenting Cathal's song repertoire included with the book I Have Travelled This Country.

References

External links

Musicians from County Fermanagh
Living people
Irish flautists
The Boys of the Lough members
1944 births
Topic Records artists